Gaskiya Ta Fi Kwabo ("The truth is worth more than a kobo"; kobo is a subunit of the Nigerian naira currency) is a Nigerian newspaper, printed three times a week. It is the world's first Hausa-language paper, and was one of northern Nigeria's first periodicals. Gaskiya Ta Fi Kwabo's first editor was Abubakar Imam. In 1941, some pages in Ajami were added to the newspaper for those who could not read the Roman script. They were called "`Yar Gaskiya" ("Daughter of Truth").

History 
The history of the paper, according to Duyile (1989) is dated back to 1937 when there was false rumour that the British Colonial Administration was planning to handover her West African Colonies to Adolf Hitler of Germany - the German leader who spearheaded World War II. This rumour created a lot of fear in the people. A medium of communication was therefore needed by the colonial masters to cancel the tension. Since there was no major newspaper in the North as compared to the South, the Government therefore concluded on setting up a vernacular newspaper which was to be known as Gaskiya Tafi Kwabo.

Publications

See also 

 Northern Nigerian Publishing Company Limited
 Abubakar Imam
 Magana Jari Ce

References

Hausa
Newspapers published in Nigeria
Newspapers established in 1939
1939 establishments in Africa